Malvaloca is a 1954 Spanish drama film directed by Ramón Torrado and starring Paquita Rico, Peter Damon and Antonio Riquelme. It is an adaptation of the 1912 play of the same title about a fallen woman from Málaga who eventually redeems herself.

Cast
 Paquita Rico as Malvaloca  
 Peter Damon as Leonardo  
 Antonio Riquelme as Silbío  
 Julia Caba Alba as Doña Enriqueta  
 Emilio Segura as Salvador  
 Arturo Marín as Diego  
 Julia Lajos as Pastelera 
 Rosario Royo as Teresona  
 Xan das Bolas as Barrabás 
 Pilar Muñoz as Juana  
 Francisco Bernal as Trabajador de la fundición  
 Pilar Gómez Ferrer as Señora cotilla  
 María Cuevas  
 Matilde Artero as Hermana Consuelo  
 Félix Briones as Tabernero  
 Julia Delgado Caro as Madre Superiora  
 Alfonso Jorge 
 Luis García Guerrero 
 Emilio Santiago as Hombre que pide prestada la mosca  
 Luis River 
 Manuel Guitián
 Ana María Ventura
 Miguel Ligero as Jeromo  
 Lina Yegros as Hermana Piedad

References

Bibliography
 Peiró, Eva Woods. White Gypsies: Race and Stardom in Spanish Musical Films. University of Minnesota Press, 2012.

External links 

1954 films
1954 drama films
Spanish drama films
1950s Spanish-language films
Spanish films based on plays
Films directed by Ramón Torrado
Films set in Málaga
Cifesa films
Films scored by Juan Quintero Muñoz
Spanish black-and-white films
1950s Spanish films